Arthur Fisher is the name of:
Arthur Fisher (British Army officer) (1899–1972), British general
Arthur Fisher (politician) (1901–1958), Australian politician
Arthur Fisher (rugby league), rugby league footballer of the 1940s and 1950s
Arthur Elwell Fisher (1848–?), English composer and musician
Arthur Hadfield Fisher (1871–1961), New Zealand cricketer
Arthur Fisher (Australian cricketer) (1882–1968), Australian cricketer
Arthur Addison Fisher (1878–1965), American architect
Arthur Stanley Theodore Fisher, 20th-century English priest and writer
Art Fisher, comedian who coined stage names of the Marx Brothers

See also

Arthur Fischer (disambiguation)